Moimenta da Serra is a Portuguese town in the municipality of Gouveia, in the province of Beira Alta, in the Central Region and sub-region of Serra da Estrela, with an area of 6.47 km² and 652 inhabitants (2011). Density: 100.8 inhab/km².

It was the seat of an extinct freguesia in 2013, as part of a national administrative reform, to, together with Vinhó, form a new freguesia called União das Freguesias de Moimenta da Serra e Vinhó, of which it is the seat.

Population

References 

Towns in Portugal